Ionuț Andrei Șerban (born 9 March 1992) is a Romanian professional footballer who plays as a midfielder for Liga I club FC Argeș Pitești. Șerban made his Liga I debut on 28 July 2013 for Viitorul Constanța in a 1-1 draw against Rapid București. He also played in Liga II for Chindia Târgoviște and Universitatea Craiova.

Honours
Chindia Târgoviște
Liga III: 2010–11

Universitatea Craiova
Liga II: 2013–14

SCM Pitești
Liga III: 2016–17

References

External links
 
 

1992 births
Living people
Sportspeople from Craiova
Romanian footballers
Association football midfielders
Liga I players
CSM Jiul Petroșani players
ACS Sticla Arieșul Turda players
FC Viitorul Constanța players
Liga II players
Liga III players
AFC Chindia Târgoviște players
CS Universitatea Craiova players
FC Argeș Pitești players